Jung Gi-woon (born 5 July 1992) is a South Korean footballer who plays as forward for Suwon FC in K League Challenge.

Career
Jung was selected by Suwon FC in the 2015 K League draft.

References

External links 

1992 births
Living people
Association football forwards
South Korean footballers
Suwon FC players
K League 2 players